Kristbergs IF is a Swedish football club located in Borensberg.

Background
Kristbergs IF currently plays in Division 4 Östergötland Västra which is the sixth tier of Swedish football. They play their home matches at the Kristberg IP in Borensberg.

Kristbergs IF are affiliated to Östergötlands Fotbollförbund.

Season to season

Footnotes

External links
 Kristbergs IF – Official website
 Kristbergs IF on Facebook

Football clubs in Östergötland County